SCAF Tocages is a football (soccer) club from the Central African Republic based in Bangui.

Achievements
Central African Republic League: 5
 1977, 1985, 1989, 2008, 2018.

Central African Republic Coupe Nationale: 3
 1984, 2001, 2019.

Performance in CAF competitions
CAF Champions League: 1 appearance
2009 – Preliminary Round

African Cup of Champions Clubs: 2 appearances
1986 – Second Round
1990 – First Round

Squad

First-team squad

Football clubs in the Central African Republic